Occasjapyx is a genus of diplurans in the family Japygidae.

Species
 Occasjapyx americanus (MacGillivray, 1893)
 Occasjapyx californicus Silvestri, 1948
 Occasjapyx carltoni Allen, 1988
 Occasjapyx kofoidi (Silvestri, 1928)
 Occasjapyx sierrensis Smith, 1959
 Occasjapyx wulingensis Xie & Yang, 1991
 Occasjapyx yangi Chou & Chen, 1983

References

Diplura